Chéries-Chéris (Festival du Film Lesbien, Gay, Bi, Trans & ++++ de Paris) is an annual international LGBT film festival held in Paris in October or November. Original titled "Festival of Gays and Lesbians of Paris", it was founded in 1994 by Yann Beauvais, Philip Brooks, Élisabeth Lebovici, and Nathalie Magnan. The festival is supported by the Ministry of Culture and the Direction régionale des affaires culturelles of Île-de-France.

From 2006 to 2009, the Canal + Short Film Award was announced. In 2010, the prize was extended to the Grand Prix, Prix d'Interpretation, Grand Prix Chéries du film documentaire, Pink TV for Documentary Prize, the Grand Prix of the Festival and the Pink TV for Short Film and a Special Mention award.

Grand prix
 2010 — Uncle David  (directors: David Hoyle, Gary Reich, and Mike Nicholls)
 2011 — Romeos  (director: Sabine Bernardi)
 2012 — Facing Mirrors  (director: Negar Azarbayjani)
 2013 — Noor   (directors: Guillaume Giovanetti, and Cagla Zencirci)
 2014 — The Smell of Us  (director: Larry Clark)
 2016 — The Ornithologist  (director: João Pedro Rodrigues)
 2017 — Call Me by Your Name   (director: Luca Guadagnino)
 2018 — The Harvesters  (director: Etienne Kallos)

References

External links 

 
 Chéries-Chéris on IMDb
  Chéries-Chéris at FilmFreeway

1994 establishments in France
Film festivals established in 1994
LGBT film festivals in France
Film festivals in Paris
LGBT culture in Paris